The Hamburg School of Astrology  originated in Hamburg, Germany, and revolved around the research and teachings of surveyor/astrologer/amateur astronomer Alfred Witte. The term Hamburg School as an astrological method  originated in 1923 at the Second German Astrological Congress in Leipzig, Germany.

The Hamburg School was established as an Association as "Astrologenverein Hamburger Schule" on October 31, 1925 at 9h45'51" PM (-1 = GMT), in Hamburg/Germany. In 1932 the first partner group was established in Düsseldorf/Germany by Theodor Keysers.

Early collaborators of Alfred Witte were Friedrich Sieggrün and Ludwig Rudolph. They believed that the 8 known planets were insufficient to make astrology work, and that there must therefore be additional planets beyond Neptune (Pluto had yet to be discovered). Witte postulated four trans-Neptunian planets, and in 1927 Sieggrün postulated another four. None of the these hypothesized planets were astronomically verifiable. Witte named his planets Cupido, Hades, Zeus and Kronos. Sieggrün expanded the list with Apollon, Admetos, Vulkanus and Poseidon.

In the 1930s, the American Richard Svehla became the official advocate of the "Hamburg School" and created the term "Uranian Astrology" in 1936 for use in the United States.

Ludwig Rudolph printed and published Witte's claims, the core of which were published in the Rulesbook for Planetary Pictures (Regelwerk für Planetenbilder) in 1928.  An increasing amount of the research of the Hamburg School revolved around astrological midpoints and use of the extra planets.

Witte and Rudolph were pursued by the Gestapo as enemies of the Third Reich.  Witte committed suicide before he could be sent to a concentration camp, and Rudolph was interned, the Rulebook for Planetary Pictures banned and burned by the Nazis.

Reinhold Ebertin, a student of Hamburg School methods, eliminated the use of the hypothetical planets while maintaining the core teachings of the Hamburg School, renamed it "Cosmobiology", and published it in The Combination of Stellar Influences in 1940, last updated in English in 1972.

After the fall of the Third Reich, the Hamburg School reconvened, and Ludwig Rudolph played the key role in perpetuating the teachings of the Hamburg School.  The Hamburg School astrologer Hermann Lefeldt combined Witte's theories with more astrological traditions such as the use of astrological houses.  However, other Hamburg practitioners maintained their focus on working only with astrological midpoints , abandoning traditional practices, including the 12 houses and rulerships.

Associations of Hamburg School Astrology (inactive) 
  Astrological Association "Hamburg School", German: Astrologenverein "Hamburger Schule", Hamburg/Germany, est. 1925
 Witte Study Group Düsseldorf, German: Witte-Studiengemeinschaft Düsseldorf, Düsseldorf/Germany, est. 1932
 Uranian Astrology Research Club, Cleveland, Ohio/USA, 1939
 Astrological Study Society (Hamburg School), German: Astrologische Studiengesellschaft (Hamburger Schule), Hamburg/Germany, est. 1947
 The Bangkok Astrological School, Bangkok/Thailand, est. 1972

Associations of Hamburg School Astrology (active) 
 The Uranian Society, New York City/USA, est. 1985 
 The International Uranian Fellowship, The Hague/Netherlands est. 2007

Publications 
 L.Rudolph, Witte: "Regelwerk für Planetenbilder von Alfred Witte - Die Astrologie von morgen", 1st Edition, Witte-Verlag Ludwig Rudolph, 1928/1929
 L.Rudolph, Witte: "Regelwerk für Planetenbilder von Alfred Witte - Die Astrologie von morgen", 2nd Edition, Witte-Verlag Ludwig Rudolph, 1932.
 L.Rudolph, Witte: "Regelwerk für Planetenbilder von Alfred Witte - Die Astrologie von morgen", 3rd Edition, Witte-Verlag Ludwig Rudolph, Hamburg 1935.
 First official English translation by Richard Svehla as: "Rulesbook for Planetary Pictures by A.Witte & L.Rudolph", Phoenix Bookshop, Cleveland/Ohio, USA 1939, Reprint 2014
 Perpetual Ephemeris: Witte, Alfred: "Immerwahrende Ephemeride fur [...]Cupido, Hades, Zeus und Kronos [...]", Special Edition from "Regelwerk...", Witte-Verlag Ludwig Rudolph, Hamburg 1935.
 Witte, Alfred: "Der Mensch - eine Empfangsstation kosmischer Suggestionen", compiled and commented by Hermann Sporner und L.Rudolph, Ludwig Rudolph (Witte-Verlag), Hamburg 1975.
 Schnitzler, Ilse: "Lexikon für Planetenbilder", Ludwig Rudolph (Witte-Verlag), Hamburg 1957.
 L.Rudolph, H.Lefeldt: "Witte: Regelwerk für Planetenbilder", Ludwig Rudolph (Witte-Verlag), Hamburg. Editions: 1946-50, 1959, 1983, 2012
 Second official English translation as: "Rulesbook for Planetary Pictures", Ludwig Rudolph (Witte-Verlag), Hamburg 1974, USA 1990 
 Brummund, Ruth: "Astropsychologische Charaktermerkmale", Ludwig Rudolph (Witte-Verlag), Hamburg 1972.
 Brummund, Ruth: "Regelwerk-Neufassung", Udo Rudolph Verlag, Hamburg 1990.

References

See also 
Astrological symbols
Astrological aspects
Astrology
Cosmobiology
Natal chart
Uranian astrology
Rules for planetary pictures

Astrology by tradition
20th century in Hamburg
Astrological aspects
History of astrology